This is the discography of English soul, R&B singer, songwriter and vocal producer Lemar who has to date released six studio albums, one compilation album and twenty-two singles. His seventh studio album will be released in 2023.

Albums

Studio albums

Compilation album

Singles

As lead artist

As featured artist

Promotional singles
 "Got Me Saying Ooh" (2001)
 "Give Me the Night" (2004)

Other charted songs

Album appearances
"I'll Be Standing By" – Ali Campbell featuring Lemar
"What am I Doing Here (Part II)" – Chicane featuring Lemar

Music videos

Notes
 "Give Me the Night," a cover version by the George Benson original, was released only as promo 12" vinyl single in 2004 (with original 2004 house mix) and in 2005 (with remixes by Soul Avengerz and Identity).

References

Discographies of British artists
Rhythm and blues discographies